Jag ringer upp is the fourth studio album by Swedish dansband Grönwalls. It was released on 13 November 1995.

Track listing
Jag ringer upp
Säj minns du parken
Om du ger mej tid
Funny How Time Slips Away
Mr Magic
Vad en kvinna vill ha
Ge mej en kyss
Itsy Bitsy
Jag har en dröm
Akta dej vad du är min
Älskat dig i smyg
I vems famn
Jag har plats i mitt hjärta
Kärleken är

Charts

References 

1995 albums
Grönwalls albums
Swedish-language albums